The Moreton Cup is a Brisbane Racing Club Group 2 Australian Thoroughbred horse race held under open handicap conditions, over a distance of 1200 metres at Doomben Racecourse in Brisbane, Australia during the Queensland Winter Racing Carnival. Prizemoney is A$250,000.

History
The inaugural running of the race was in 1979 as the Katies Cup

Name

1979–1982 - Katies Cup
 1983 - Westfield Cup 
1984–1990 - Ansett Cup
 1991 - Ansett Australia Cup
 1992 - QTC Cup
1993–1995 - Qantas Cup
1996–2016 - QTC Cup
2017 onwards - Moreton Cup

Grade
1979–1983 -  Group 3
1984 onwards - Group 2 race

Distance
1979–2005 – 1200 metres
2006–2014 – 1300 metres
2015 – 1200 metres
2016 – 1300 metres
2017 onwards – 1200 metres

Venue
Due to track reconstruction of Eagle Farm Racecourse for the 2014–15 racing season the event was transferred to Doomben Racecourse.
The event was moved in 2018 to the Sunshine Coast.

 2015, 2017 - Doomben Racecourse
 2018 - Corbould Park Racecourse
 2022 - Eagle Farm Racecourse

Winners

 2022 - Baller
 2021 - Baller
 2020 - ‡race not held
 2019 - Pretty In Pink
 2018 - The Monstar
 2017 - Deploy
 2016 - Spill The Beans
 2015 - Ball Of Muscle
 2014 - Sacred Star
 2013 - Galah
 2012 - Celtic Dancer
 2011 - Varrena Miss
 2010 - Catapulted
 2009 - Ortensia
 2008 - Chinchilla Rose
 2007 - Nova Star
 2006 - Messiaen
 2005 - Sir Breakfast
 2004 - Falkirk
 2003 - Into The Night
 2002 - Pembleton
 2001 - Century Kid
 2000 - Gallopini
 1999 - race not held
 1998 - Scandinavia
 1997 - Celestial Choir
 1996 - Hareeba
 1995 - Bulldog Yeats
 1994 - Bellzevir
 1993 - Overpitch
 1992 - Schillaci
 1991 - Heavenly Knight
 1990 - Rechabite
 1989 - Vitalic
 1988 - race not held
 1987 - Tolai
 1986 - Eye Of The Sky
 1985 - Pete's Choice
 1984 - Manuan
 1983 - Nosey Parker
 1982 - My Gold Hope
 1981 - Tulip Town
 1980 - Winter's Dance
 1979 - Famoso Gris

‡ Not held because of the COVID-19 pandemic

See also
 List of Australian Group races
 Group races

References

Horse races in Australia
Open sprint category horse races
Sport in Brisbane